Naini (also known as Naini Industrial Area) is a satellite neighborhood and a twin city of Prayagraj in Prayagraj district, Uttar Pradesh, India. By the 1950s Naini was established as the chief industrial area of the city.

History
Naini had a prison, Naini Central Prison, where many, including Pt. Jawahar Lal Nehru, the first Prime Minister of India—were imprisoned during the Indian independence movement. The first official Airmail flight in the world arrived in Naini from Allahabad. Henri Pequet carried 6,500 letters a distance of 13 km. This was the first commercial civil aviation flight in India.

Geography
Naini is located on the banks of River Yamuna, opposite Allahabad City. To the north, across the Ganges, is Jhunsi, which is a part of Allahabad itself. There are no direct paths or roadways between Jhusi and Naini.

Economy
Naini developed into major industrial centre. Some of the notable industries in Naini include Alstom, ITI Limited, Bharat Pumps & Compressors (headquarters), Areva, Steel Authority of India Limited (SAIL), Food Corporation of India (FCI). Industrial development in Naini is increasing as the Government of India has approved Allahabad-Naini-Bara Investment Zone (3000 hectares) which is to be funded by the World Bank.

Education

University
 Sam Higginbottom University of Agriculture, Technology and Sciences

Institutes, Schools and Colleges
 ST.Joseph`s School Naini, Prayagraj
 Digital Sahara, Digital marketing and IT Solutions, Naini, Prayagraj
Ethel Higginbottom School and College 
 Maharishi Vidya Mandir Sr. Secondary School, Allahabad
 Delhi Public School, Devrakh, Naini, Allahabad
 Suman Vidya Niketan, Inter College, Naini, Allahabad
 Bethany Convent School, Naini Allahabad
 Prof. Rajendra Singh (Rajju Bhaiya) University
 United College of Engineering and Research 
 Nand Kishore Singh Degree College, Dhanuha, Chaka, Naini, Allahabad
 Saint John's Academy, Mirzapur Road, Allahabad
 Apex College of Education, Naini, Allahabad
 Madhav Gyan Kendra Inter College Kharkauni, Naini, Allahabad 
 Kendriya Vidyalaya ITI Naini, Allahabad
 Kendriya Vidyalaya COD Naini, Allahabad
 Laurels International School, Naini
 Semstar Global School, Naini
 Amar public School, Naini
 Hemwati Nandan Bahuguna PG College, Naini, Allahabad
 Ranjit Pandit Inter College, Naini, Allahabad

Transport

Naini is connected to Allahabad via two bridges over the river Yamuna. The older one, Old Naini Bridge built in 1927, is a two lane bridge. The new one, New Yamuna Bridge was completed in 2004. NH-2 joins the Naini to Rewa through Ghoorpur.

Tempos, Bus and autos are the main mode of travel in Naini-Allahabad. This route doesn't have a very frequent local bus service, but recently, UPSRTC has launched the city bus services, making easier the public transportation from Naini to other nearby places, including heart of the city.

Apart from Naini Railway, Cheoki station is also used, but mainly it is used for transporting goods. However, in recent times, Cheoki railway station has started to become more important as many of the trains are getting their schedule changed where in it is replacing Allahabad Junction itself.

References

Neighbourhoods in Allahabad